Chris Sneed is an American politician who has served in the Oklahoma House of Representatives from the 14th district since 2018.

References

Living people
Republican Party members of the Oklahoma House of Representatives
21st-century American politicians
Year of birth missing (living people)